Strategus aloeus, the ox beetle, is a species of rhinoceros beetle. The "major" males of this species have three large horns on their thoraces, resembling the Triceratops. The "minor" males have horns, as well, but the two back ones are small and the frontal horn is much shorter than the horn in major males. The female ox beetle has a very short horn which has little use in fighting, but is used for digging in the ground.

Although this species occurs in the United States, its populations are much higher in Mexico, Central America and parts of South America.

The larvae of this species feed on roots in the ground, while the adults feed on flowers and all sorts of fruit. The larvae take around four to six months to reach the pupal stage. The pupal stage can be shortened in captivity by placing the pupae in a warm area. The adults are active from May to November, and during this time both males and females try to mate. These beetles are very common near lights in the summer and can be collected in large numbers in some areas. Their larvae are sometimes considered a pest because they can damage lawns and gardens by feeding on the roots.

References
Coin, Patrick and Phillip Harpootlian. "Species Strategus aloeus". Online: http://bugguide.net/node/view/6278. July 29, 2006.

External links 
Strategus aloeus photos at Beetlespace.wz.cz
Strategus aloeus photos at BugGuide
Strategus aloeus photos at Goliathus.com

Dynastinae
Beetles of North America
Beetles of South America
Arthropods of Colombia
Beetles described in 1758
Taxa named by Carl Linnaeus